Readman is a surname. Notable people with the surname include:

Angela Readman (born 1973), English poet
David Readman (born 1970), English singer
Paul Readman, political and cultural historian
Sylvie Readman (born 1958), Canadian photographer
Em Readman (born 1999), Australian writer

Fictional characters:
Yomiko Readman, the protagonist in the Japanese novel series Read or Die

de:Readman